Nowy Targ Airport is a grass airfield serving Nowy Targ, Podhale, Poland, opened in 1930. In 1962 LOT Polish Airlines commenced  a scheduled service between Nowy Targ and Warsaw, but this was terminated after 10 flights when it was decided to discontinue the use of grass airfields.

References

Airports in Poland
Nowy Targ County
Buildings and structures in Lesser Poland Voivodeship